Charmont is the name or part of the name of the following communes in France:

 Charmont, Marne, in the Marne department
 Charmont, Val-d'Oise, in the Val-d'Oise department
 Charmont-en-Beauce, in the Loiret department
 Charmont-sous-Barbuise, in the Aube department
 Grand-Charmont, in the Doubs department
 Vieux-Charmont, in the Doubs department